Ziaabad (also Romanized as Ẕīā’ābād, Ẕeyā’ābād, and Zīya Abad; formerly, Shahr-e Shaqayeq (Persian: شَهرِ شَقايِق), also Romanized as Shahr-e Shaqāyeq) is a city and capital of Ziaabad District, in Takestan County, Qazvin Province, Iran. At the 2016 census its population was 23,680 in 6,411 families. The city is populated by Azerbaijani Turks. The main souvenir of this city is walnut.

See also 

 Hossein Lashkari
 Seyyed Mohammad Ziaabadi

References 

Populated places in Takestan County
Cities in Qazvin Province